Ben Moreell was a lake freighter on the North American Great Lakes.

In 1958 she collided with the ferry Ashtabula in the harbor of Ashtabula, Ohio.

In 1977 she was renamed Alastair Guthrie.

References

Great Lakes freighters
1906 ships
Maritime incidents in 1958